Remco Boere (born 29 October 1961) is a Dutch former professional footballer who played as a striker.

Playing career
A much-travelled forward, Boere played club football for Roda JC and ADO Den Haag in the Eredivisie. He also played for Iraklis in the Greek Super League and Gil Vicente in the Portuguese Liga.

Boere finished his playing career with FC Zwolle of the Eerste Divisie, initially signing a two-year deal with the club in August 1992.

Managerial career
After retiring as a player, Boere managed Dutch amateur sides Go Ahead Kampen and Nunspeet and worked for years in Qatar in different jobs. He then had a spell in Sweden with Köping FF and at Libyan giants Al-Ahli, before moving above the Arctic Circle to coach Norwegian fourth-tier outfit Hammerfest ahead of the 2014 season.

Personal life
Boere lives in Sweden with his second wife and their son. He has four children from a previous marriage.

His brother, Jeroen, was also a professional footballer who once played for English Premier League side West Ham United.

Honours

Individual
 Eerste Divisie top scorer: 1983–84 (27 goals), 1985–86 (28 goals)

References

1961 births
Living people
Footballers from Rotterdam
Association football forwards
Dutch footballers
Excelsior Rotterdam players
Roda JC Kerkrade players
SBV Vitesse players
SC Cambuur players
ADO Den Haag players
K.A.A. Gent players
Iraklis Thessaloniki F.C. players
Gil Vicente F.C. players
PEC Zwolle players
Eredivisie players
Eerste Divisie players
Belgian Pro League players
Super League Greece players
Primeira Liga players
Dutch expatriate footballers
Expatriate footballers in Belgium
Dutch expatriate sportspeople in Belgium
Expatriate footballers in Greece
Dutch expatriate sportspeople in Greece
Expatriate footballers in Portugal
Dutch expatriate sportspeople in Portugal
Dutch football managers
Dutch expatriate football managers
Expatriate football managers in Qatar
Expatriate football managers in Sweden
Expatriate football managers in Norway
Dutch expatriate sportspeople in Qatar
Dutch expatriate sportspeople in Sweden
Dutch expatriate sportspeople in Norway
Dutch expatriate sportspeople in Libya